Zulfat Suara is a Nigerian-American activist, businesswoman, and politician. In September 2019, she became the first Muslim to be elected to the Metropolitan Government of Nashville and Davidson County and the first immigrant elected to an at-large position. She is also the first Muslim woman elected in the State of Tennessee  and the first Nigerian woman elected to any office in the United States.

Early life, education, and career 
Suara is originally from Ibadan, Nigeria. She was a head prefect of her high school and was Amira for the college and state chapters of the Muslim Students Society of Nigeria. She graduated with a Higher National Diploma in Accountancy with High Honors (Upper Credit) from The Polytechnic, Ibadan. She came to the U.S. in 1993 when her husband was offered a fellowship at Vanderbilt University.   

After moving to Tennessee, she earned her District of Columbia Certified Public Accountant (CPA) certificate in 1996 and her Tennessee State CPA License in 1999. For two years, she worked full-time as a CPA for KPMG in Nashville. Suara later founded her own accounting firm that worked with several county governments across the West Tennessee region. She is the Executive Director of Grants & Contracts at Meharry Medical College.

Community involvement 
Between 2009 and 2011, Suara served two terms as the State President of Business and Professional Women's Foundation (BPW). From this role, she became the Tennessee Women’s Day on the Hill Chair for seven years, leading an annual event that allows women’s advocacy organizations to present directly to politicians in Tennessee. Suara is also a board member of the Women’s Fund of the Community Foundation of Middle TN, a 2020 board member of Women Business Collaborative, and an annual speaker at the Tennessee Women’s March. In 2015, she was inducted into the Tennessee Women's Hall of Fame.

In 2004, Suara started the Hardeman County, Tennessee Chapter of Junior Achievement to improve educational opportunities and outcomes in rural Tennessee. As a result, she won the FBI Director Community Leadership Award in January 2016. She serves as a board member of the PENCIL foundation in Nashville, TN. She is a recipient of the National Education Association’s Mary Hatwood Futrell Human Rights Award (2020).

Suara is also involved in the American Muslim Advisory Council (AMAC), an organization that was created as a response to the “anti-Shariah” bill in 2012. Beyond acting as a founder of the organization, she was Chair from 2012-2016 and 2018-2019, and in 2021 she was AMAC’s treasurer. In 2018, the Islamic Society of North America recognized her as the ISNA Muslim Advocate of the year.

Political career

Local politics 
Suara first ran for office in 2014 as a candidate for the Hardeman County School Board. Her campaign designated her as the first Muslim woman to run for any office in the state of Tennessee. She

ended the election with 41% of the vote against the chairman of the board. In 2019, she launched her second campaign as a candidate for Nashville Metro Council. Promoting a “Nashville for All”, she pushed for the implementation of more fiscally responsible government practices, community-based budgeting, and improved access to quality education for the city’s youth.

During her campaign, Suara faced pushback due to her religion, even receiving death threats. With over 34 thousand votes, she won the Metro Council seat and became the first Muslim woman elected in the State of Tennessee and the first Nigerian woman elected to any office in the United States. She will serve on the Council until 2023. 

In office, Suara has served as chair of the Affordable Housing Committee, Vice-chair of the Education Committee, and Member of the Budget/Finance, Audit, and Personnel/Public Relations committees.

Following the death of Representative John Robert Lewis, Suara led an effort to honor the late congressman and highlight Nashville’s role in the civil rights movement. Working with the minority caucus and other community leaders, she sponsored a city ordinance in November 2020 to rename Fifth Avenue from Jefferson Street to I-40 to Rep. John Lewis Way. The new name was officially adopted on the first anniversary of Rep. Lewis’ death.

State and national politics 
Suara serves as Treasurer of the National Women's Political Caucus (NWPC). Prior to this role, she served as President-Elect of the Tennessee Women's Political Caucus. She also served as the Treasurer and Vice President of Political Planning for the organization at the state level.

In 2020, Suara was a member of the DNC Platform Committee, where she submitted an amendment regarding the treatment of international students that became part of the party’s national platform. She also served as the Tennessee State co-chair of Bernie Sanders’ Presidential Campaign in 2020.

Testifying before the US House Sub-Committee 
On March 1, 2022, Zulfat, along with other community leaders testified before the House Subcommittee on the Constitution, Civil Rights, and Civil Liberties on the Discrimination and the Civil Rights of the Muslim, Arab, and South Asian American Communities. Zulfat's written and oral testimonies highlighted the many incidences of discrimination in the Muslim community at the local, state, and federal levels.

Personal life 
Zulfat Suara married Dr. Rahaman Suara in 1990. They emigrated from Nigeria in 1993 and live with their five children in Nashville, TN.

References 

Nigerian emigrants to the United States

Year of birth missing (living people)
Living people